The Socialist Solidarity Network was a grouping of socialists in the United Kingdom most of whom were former members of the Socialist Party. They supported the Socialist Alliance in England and support the Scottish Socialist Party in Scotland.

The SSN's supporters included Lesley Mahmood, a long-time member of the Militant group, and Phil Hearse, former editor of Socialist Outlook.

In 2002, the Network absorbed the Socialist Democracy Group. In 2003, launched the publication Socialist Resistance together with the International Socialist Group.

The group ceased to function in the 2000s, as SR transformed itself into the USFI section in Britain, effectively re-absorbing some people such as Phil Hearse, while others such as Lesley Mahmood and Mandy Baker were no longer involved.

References

External links
Socialist Resistance

Defunct Trotskyist organisations in the United Kingdom
Scottish Socialist Party
2000s disestablishments in the United Kingdom